Udayanga is a Sinhalese name that may refer to the following notable people:
Udayanga Weeratunga, Sri Lankan businessman 
Dulash Udayanga (born 1995), Sri Lankan cricketer
Imesh Udayanga (born 1990), Sri Lankan cricketer

Sinhalese surnames
Sinhalese masculine given names